The Kuntsevo Constituency (No.197) is a Russian legislative constituency in Moscow. It is based in Western Moscow. In 2016 reconfiguration it absorbed parts of former Universitetsky constituency: Prospekt Vernadskogo and Ramenki (where Moscow State University campus is located).

Members elected

Election results

1993

|-
! colspan=2 style="background-color:#E9E9E9;text-align:left;vertical-align:top;" |Candidate
! style="background-color:#E9E9E9;text-align:left;vertical-align:top;" |Party
! style="background-color:#E9E9E9;text-align:right;" |Votes
! style="background-color:#E9E9E9;text-align:right;" |%
|-
|style="background-color:#0085BE"|
|align=left|Georgy Zadonsky
|align=left|Choice of Russia
|48,606
|19.82%
|-
|style="background-color:"|
|align=left|Grigory Kovalenko
|align=left|Independent
| -
|15.36%
|-
| colspan="5" style="background-color:#E9E9E9;"|
|- style="font-weight:bold"
| colspan="3" style="text-align:left;" | Total
| 245,249
| 100%
|-
| colspan="5" style="background-color:#E9E9E9;"|
|- style="font-weight:bold"
| colspan="4" |Source:
|
|}

1995

|-
! colspan=2 style="background-color:#E9E9E9;text-align:left;vertical-align:top;" |Candidate
! style="background-color:#E9E9E9;text-align:left;vertical-align:top;" |Party
! style="background-color:#E9E9E9;text-align:right;" |Votes
! style="background-color:#E9E9E9;text-align:right;" |%
|-
|style="background-color:"|
|align=left|Aleksey Golovkov
|align=left|Independent
|74,556
|24.67%
|-
|style="background-color:#3A46CE"|
|align=left|Georgy Zadonsky (incumbent)
|align=left|Democratic Choice of Russia – United Democrats
|46,809
|15.49%
|-
|style="background-color:"|
|align=left|Viktor Uchitel
|align=left|Yabloko
|41,587
|13.76%
|-
|style="background-color:"|
|align=left|Sergey Shuvalov
|align=left|Communist Party
|33,525
|11.09%
|-
|style="background-color:#A8A821"|
|align=left|Oleg Petrov
|align=left|Stable Russia
|14,415
|4.77%
|-
|style="background-color:#D50000"|
|align=left|Mikhail Davydov
|align=left|Communists and Working Russia - for the Soviet Union
|13,097
|4.33%
|-
|style="background-color:#DA2021"|
|align=left|Yury Yemelyanov
|align=left|Ivan Rybkin Bloc
|8,901
|2.95%
|-
|style="background-color:#295EC4"|
|align=left|Anastasia Grusha
|align=left|Party of Economic Freedom
|7,466
|2.47%
|-
|style="background-color:"|
|align=left|Vitaly Timashov
|align=left|Independent
|6,727
|2.23%
|-
|style="background-color:"|
|align=left|Dmitry Anisimov-Spiridonov
|align=left|Independent
|5,367
|1.78%
|-
|style="background-color:#000000"|
|colspan=2 |against all
|40,859
|13.52%
|-
| colspan="5" style="background-color:#E9E9E9;"|
|- style="font-weight:bold"
| colspan="3" style="text-align:left;" | Total
| 302,210
| 100%
|-
| colspan="5" style="background-color:#E9E9E9;"|
|- style="font-weight:bold"
| colspan="4" |Source:
|
|}

1999

|-
! colspan=2 style="background-color:#E9E9E9;text-align:left;vertical-align:top;" |Candidate
! style="background-color:#E9E9E9;text-align:left;vertical-align:top;" |Party
! style="background-color:#E9E9E9;text-align:right;" |Votes
! style="background-color:#E9E9E9;text-align:right;" |%
|-
|style="background-color:#3B9EDF"|
|align=left|Valery Grebennikov
|align=left|Fatherland – All Russia
|63,398
|20.79%
|-
|style="background-color:"|
|align=left|Telman Gdlyan
|align=left|Independent
|46,585
|15.28%
|-
|style="background-color:#1042A5"|
|align=left|Georgy Zadonsky
|align=left|Union of Right Forces
|28,549
|9.36%
|-
|style="background-color:"|
|align=left|Natalya Burykina
|align=left|Independent
|28,451
|9.33%
|-
|style="background-color:"|
|align=left|Reonold Filimonov
|align=left|Communist Party
|24,953
|8.18%
|-
|style="background-color:"|
|align=left|Andrey Boldin
|align=left|Independent
|16,077
|5.27%
|-
|style="background-color:"|
|align=left|Grigory Pasko
|align=left|Russian Ecological Party "Kedr"
|11,861
|3.89%
|-
|style="background-color:#084284"|
|align=left|Viktor Isaychenkov
|align=left|Spiritual Heritage
|6,526
|2.14%
|-
|style="background-color:#020266"|
|align=left|Tatyana Bryntsalova
|align=left|Russian Socialist Party
|6,098
|2.00%
|-
|style="background-color:"|
|align=left|Roman Tushchenko
|align=left|Independent
|5,100
|1.67%
|-
|style="background-color:#CC0000"|
|align=left|Tatyana Tsyba
|align=left|Social-Democrats of Russia
|1,627
|0.53%
|-
|style="background-color:#000000"|
|colspan=2 |against all
|57,273
|18.78%
|-
| colspan="5" style="background-color:#E9E9E9;"|
|- style="font-weight:bold"
| colspan="3" style="text-align:left;" | Total
| 304,901
| 100%
|-
| colspan="5" style="background-color:#E9E9E9;"|
|- style="font-weight:bold"
| colspan="4" |Source:
|
|}

2003

|-
! colspan=2 style="background-color:#E9E9E9;text-align:left;vertical-align:top;" |Candidate
! style="background-color:#E9E9E9;text-align:left;vertical-align:top;" |Party
! style="background-color:#E9E9E9;text-align:right;" |Votes
! style="background-color:#E9E9E9;text-align:right;" |%
|-
|style="background-color:"|
|align=left|Valery Grebennikov (incumbent)
|align=left|United Russia
|77,108
|29.52%
|-
|style="background-color:"|
|align=left|Galina Zhukova
|align=left|Independent
|33,845
|12.96%
|-
|style="background-color:"|
|align=left|Dmitry Prokhorov
|align=left|Independent
|26,508
|10.15%
|-
|style="background-color:"|
|align=left|Pavel Basanets
|align=left|Communist Party
|24,753
|9.48%
|-
|style="background-color:"|
|align=left|Mikhail Bernovsky
|align=left|Independent
|8,837
|3.38%
|-
|style="background-color:"|
|align=left|Igor Dyakov
|align=left|Liberal Democratic Party
|8,643
|3.31%
|-
|style="background-color: #00A1FF"|
|align=left|Kamilzhan Kalandarov
|align=left|Party of Russia's Rebirth-Russian Party of Life
|4,227
|1.62%
|-
|style="background-color:#164C8C"|
|align=left|Tengiz Begishvili
|align=left|United Russian Party Rus'
|1,892
|0.72%
|-
|style="background-color:#000000"|
|colspan=2 |against all
|69,070
|26.44%
|-
| colspan="5" style="background-color:#E9E9E9;"|
|- style="font-weight:bold"
| colspan="3" style="text-align:left;" | Total
| 262,443
| 100%
|-
| colspan="5" style="background-color:#E9E9E9;"|
|- style="font-weight:bold"
| colspan="4" |Source:
|
|}

2016

|-
! colspan=2 style="background-color:#E9E9E9;text-align:left;vertical-align:top;" |Candidate
! style="background-color:#E9E9E9;text-align:left;vertical-align:top;" |Party
! style="background-color:#E9E9E9;text-align:right;" |Votes
! style="background-color:#E9E9E9;text-align:right;" |%
|-
|style="background-color:"|
|align=left|Vyacheslav Lysakov
|align=left|United Russia
|47,766
|29.52%
|-
|style="background-color:"|
|align=left|Yulia Mikhaylova
|align=left|Communist Party
|25,184
|15.17%
|-
|style="background-color:"|
|align=left|Igor Nikolaev
|align=left|Yabloko
|21,229
|13.12%
|-
|style="background-color:"|
|align=left|Yaroslav Nilov
|align=left|Liberal Democratic Party
|14,283
|8.83%
|-
|style="background-color:"|
|align=left|Yevgeny Kolesov
|align=left|Rodina
|13,220
|8.17%
|-
|style="background-color:"|
|align=left|Oleg Kazenkov
|align=left|A Just Russia
|12,486
|7.72%
|-
|style="background-color:"|
|align=left|Tatyana Mineeva
|align=left|Party of Growth
|8,676
|5.36%
|-
|style="background:#00A650;"| 
|align=left|Natalia Yeliseeva
|align=left|Civilian Power
|5,853
|3.62%
|-
|style="background:"|
|align=left|Vadim Lukashevich
|align=left|People's Freedom Party
|5,427
|3.35%
|-
| colspan="5" style="background-color:#E9E9E9;"|
|- style="font-weight:bold"
| colspan="3" style="text-align:left;" | Total
| 161,798
| 100%
|-
| colspan="5" style="background-color:#E9E9E9;"|
|- style="font-weight:bold"
| colspan="4" |Source:
|
|}

2021

|-
! colspan=2 style="background-color:#E9E9E9;text-align:left;vertical-align:top;" |Candidate
! style="background-color:#E9E9E9;text-align:left;vertical-align:top;" |Party
! style="background-color:#E9E9E9;text-align:right;" |Votes
! style="background-color:#E9E9E9;text-align:right;" |%
|-
|style="background-color: " |
|align=left|Yevgeny Popov
|align=left|United Russia
|80,894
|35.17%
|-
|style="background-color: " |
|align=left|Mikhail Lobanov
|align=left|Communist Party
|72,805
|31.65%
|-
|style="background-color: " |
|align=left|Aleksandr Tarnavsky
|align=left|A Just Russia — For Truth
|13,421
|5.84%
|-
|style="background-color: "|
|align=left|Boris Balmont
|align=left|New People
|11,709
|5.09%
|-
|style="background-color: " |
|align=left|Kirill Goncharov
|align=left|Yabloko
|11,648
|5.06%
|-
|style="background-color: " |
|align=left|Pavel Ramensky
|align=left|Liberal Democratic Party
|10,475
|4.55%
|-
|style="background-color: " |
|align=left|Darya Mitina
|align=left|Communists of Russia
|6,493
|2.82%
|-
|style="background: ;"| 
|align=left|Igor Glek
|align=left|The Greens
|5,473
|2.38%
|-
|style="background: ;"| 
|align=left|Vladislava Gorshkova
|align=left|Green Alternative
|5,436
|2.36%
|-
|style="background-color:"|
|align=left|Aleksey Sobolev
|align=left|Rodina
|3,789
|1.65%
|-
|style="background-color:"|
|align=left|Mikhail Menshikov
|align=left|Party of Growth
|3,604
|1.57%
|-
| colspan="5" style="background-color:#E9E9E9;"|
|- style="font-weight:bold"
| colspan="3" style="text-align:left;" | Total
| 230,007
| 100%
|-
| colspan="5" style="background-color:#E9E9E9;"|
|- style="font-weight:bold"
| colspan="4" |Source:
|
|}

Notes

Sources
197. Кунцевский одномандатный избирательный округ

References

Russian legislative constituencies
Politics of Moscow